The 2019 Paddy Power Champions League of Darts was the 4th annual staging of the Champions League of Darts, organised by the Professional Darts Corporation. It took place from 19–20 October 2019 at the Morningside Arena, Leicester.

The defending champion was Gary Anderson who beat Peter Wright 11–4 in the 2018 final, but he was eliminated in the group stage.

Michael van Gerwen won the Champions League for the first time, beating Peter Wright 11–10 in the final, surviving three match darts at 7–10, and by winning that title, van Gerwen became the only player to win every PDC premier event title at least once.

Format
The eight qualifiers are split into two groups, playing each other once in a best of 19 legs match. The top two of each group then proceed to the semi-finals. Both semi-finals and the final are a best of 21 legs match.

Prize money

Qualifiers
The top 7 players on the PDC Order of Merit following the 2019 World Matchplay qualified. Reigning champion Gary Anderson was given a guaranteed place in the tournament, as he was the defending champion. As Anderson was in the top seven, the eighth ranked player also qualified.

Gerwyn Price made his Champions League debut.

  Michael van Gerwen (champion)
  Rob Cross (group stage)
  Daryl Gurney (group stage)
  Michael Smith (semi-finals)
  Gary Anderson (group stage)
  Peter Wright (runner-up)
  Gerwyn Price (semi-finals)
  James Wade (group stage)

Results

Group stage
All matches first-to-10 (best of 19 legs)

NB: P = Played; W = Won; L = Lost; LF = Legs for; LA = Legs against; +/− = Plus/minus record, in relation to legs; Avg = Three-dart average in group matches; Pts = Group points

Group A

19 October

19 October

20 October

Group B

19 October

19 October

20 October

Knockout stage

References

Champions League of Darts
Champions League of Darts
2019 in English sport
Sport in Leicester
Champions League of Darts